Media City may refer to:

 Dubai Media City
 Jordan Media City
 MediaCityUK